In ancient Greek religion and myth, the Anemoi (Greek: , "Winds") were wind gods who were each ascribed a cardinal direction from which their respective winds came (see Classical compass winds), and were each associated with various seasons and weather conditions. They were the progeny of the goddess of the dawn Eos and her husband Astraeus.

Etymology 
"priestess of the winds". These words, written in Linear B, are found on the KN Fp 1 and KN Fp 13 tablets.

Mythology

The Anemoi are minor gods and are subject to the god Aeolus. They were sometimes represented as gusts of wind, and at other times were personified as winged men. They were also sometimes depicted as horses kept in the stables of the storm god Aeolus, who provided Odysseus with the Anemoi in the Odyssey. The Spartans were reported to sacrifice a horse to the winds on Mount Taygetus. Astraeus, the astrological deity (sometimes associated with Aeolus), and Eos/Aurora, the goddess of the dawn, were the parents of the Anemoi, according to the Greek poet Hesiod.

Of the four chief Anemoi, Boreas (Aquilo in Roman mythology) is the north wind and bringer of cold winter air, Zephyrus (Favonius in Latin) is the west wind and bringer of light spring and early-summer breezes, and Notus (Auster in Latin) is the south wind and bringer of the storms of late summer and autumn; Eurus, the southeast (or according to some, the east) wind, was not associated with any of the three Greek seasons, and is the only one of these four Anemoi not mentioned in Hesiod's Theogony or in the  Orphic hymns.

The deities equivalent to the Anemoi in Roman mythology were the Venti (Latin, "winds"). These gods had different names, but were otherwise very similar to their Greek counterparts, borrowing their attributes and being frequently conflated with them. Ptolemy's world map listed 12 winds: Septentrio (N), Aquilo (NNE), Vulturnus (NE), Subsolanus (E), Eurus (SE), Euroauster (SSE), Austeronotus (S), Euronotus (SSW), Africus (SW), Zephirus (W), Eurus (NW), Circius (NNW).

Boreas

Boreas (also) is the Greek god of the cold north wind, storms and winter. Although he was normally taken as the north wind, the Roman writers Aulus Gellius and Pliny the Elder both took Boreas as a northeast wind, equivalent to the Roman Aquilo, similar to Nor'easter winter storms. Boreas is depicted as being very strong, with a violent temper to match. He was frequently shown as a winged old man or sometimes as a young man with shaggy hair and beard, holding a conch shell and wearing a billowing cloak. Pausanias wrote that Boreas had snakes instead of feet, though in art he was usually depicted with winged human feet.

Boreas was closely associated with horses, storms and winter. He was said to have fathered twelve colts after taking the form of a stallion, to the mares of Erichthonius, king of Dardania. These were said to be able to run across a field of grain without trampling the plants. Pliny the Elder (Natural History iv.35 and viii.67) thought that mares might stand with their hindquarters to the North Wind and bear foals without a stallion. The Greeks believed that his home was in Thrace, and Herodotus and Pliny both describe a northern land known as Hyperborea "Beyond the North Wind" where people lived in complete happiness and had extraordinarily long lifespans. He is said to have fathered three giant Hyperborean priests of Apollo by Chione.

When the goddess Leto, pregnant with Artemis and Apollo, was due, Boreas was ordered by Zeus to bring her to Poseidon, who in turn led her to the island of Ogygia where she could give birth to the twins, as Zeus' wife Hera had ordered all places and land to shun Leto.

Boreas was also said to have kidnapped Orithyia, an Athenian princess, from the Ilisos. Boreas had taken a fancy to Orithyia and had initially pleaded for her favours, hoping to persuade her. When this failed, he reverted to his usual temper and abducted her as she danced on the banks of the Ilisos. Boreas wrapped Orithyia up in a cloud, raped her, and with her, Boreas fathered two sons—the Boreads, Zethes and Calais, who were part of the crew of the Argo as Argonauts.—and two daughters—Chione, goddess of snow, and Cleopatra.

From then on, the Athenians saw Boreas as a relative by marriage. When Athens was threatened by Xerxes, the people prayed to Boreas, who was said to have then caused winds to sink 400 Persian ships. A cult was established in Athens in 480 B. C. E. in gratitude to the Boreas for destroying the approaching Persian fleet.  A similar event had occurred twelve years earlier, and Herodotus writes:

 Now I cannot say if this was really why the Persians were caught at anchor by the stormwind, but the Athenians are quite positive that, just as Boreas helped them before, so Boreas was responsible for what happened on this occasion also. And when they went home they built the god a shrine by the River Ilissus.

Two other cases of Boreas being honored by Greek states for similar assistance have been described, in Megalopolis (against Laconia) and in Thurii (against Syracuse). The latter case had Boreas being granted citizenship and a land plot.

The abduction of Orithyia was popular in Athens before and after the Persian War, and was frequently depicted on vase paintings. In these paintings, Boreas was portrayed as a bearded man in a tunic, with shaggy hair that is sometimes frosted and spiked. The abduction was also dramatized in Aeschylus's lost play Oreithyia.

In other accounts, Boreas was the father of Butes (by another woman) and the lover of the nymph Pitys. In one story, both Pan and Boreas vied for Pitys's affections, and tried to make her choose between them. To impress her, Boreas uprooted all the trees with his might. But Pan only laughed, and Pitys choose him instead of Boreas. Angry, Boreas chased Pitys down and threw her off a cliff, killing her. Gaia, pitying the girl, changed her dead body into a pine tree.

In an Aesop fable, Boreas and his uncle Helios the sun god argued about which one between them was the strongest god. They agreed that whoever was able to make a passing traveller remove his cloak would be declared the winner. Boreas was the one to try his luck first; but no matter how hard he blew, he could not remove the man's cloak, instead making him wrap his cloak around him even tighter. Helios shone bright then, and the traveller, overcome with the heat, removed his cloak, giving him the victory; the moral is that persuasion is better than force.

According to Pausanias, Boreas blessed Musaeus with the gift of flight.

Aquilo (Septentrio)
The Roman equivalent of Boreas was Aquilo. This north (and slightly east) wind was associated with winter. The poet Virgil writes:

For the wind which came directly from the north the Romans sometimes used the name Septentrio, which refers to the seven stars of the Plow or Big Dipper constellation. The name "Septentrio" gave rise to the pre-modern compass point Septentrionalis.

Zephyrus (Favonius)

Zephyrus (Gk.  []), sometimes shortened in English to Zephyr, is the Greek god of the west wind or continental tropical air mass (cT). The gentlest of the winds, Zephyrus is known as the fructifying wind, the messenger of spring. It was thought that Zephyrus lived in a cave in Thrace.

Zephyrus was reported as having several wives in different stories. He was said to be the husband of Iris, goddess of the rainbow. He abducted the goddess Chloris, and gave her the domain of flowers. With Chloris, he fathered Karpos ('fruit'). He is said to have vied for Chloris's love with his brother Boreas, eventually winning her devotion. Additionally, with yet another sister and lover, the harpy Podarge (also known as Celaeno), Zephyrus was said to be the father of Balius and Xanthus, Achilles' horses.

In the story of Eros and Psyche, Zephyrus served Eros (or Cupid) by transporting Psyche to his abode.

Zephyrus was also claimed to have killed one of Apollo's many male lovers Hyacinth out of jealousy. Hyacinth was killed by a discus thrown by Apollo. Though according to some sources, his death was said to be an accident, others said that Zephyrus was the true culprit, having blown the discus off course.

Zephyrus' Roman equivalent was Favonius (the "favouring") who held dominion over plants and flowers. The Roman poet Horace writes:

Notus (Auster)

Notus was the Greek god of the south wind or marine tropical air mass (mT). He was associated with the desiccating hot wind of the rise of Sirius after midsummer, was thought to bring the storms of late summer and early autumn, and was feared as a destroyer of crops.

Notus' equivalent in Roman mythology was Auster, the embodiment of the sirocco wind, a southerly wind which brings cloudy weather, powerful winds and rain to southern Europe. (Auster named the compass point Australis and the country's name Australia.) The Auster winds are mentioned in Virgil's Aeneid Book II, lines 304–307:

Another Roman poet, Tibullus 1.1, lines 47–48, speaks of the pleasure of lying in bed on rainy winter days:

The name Australia (the "southern land") is derived from Auster.

Eurus (Vulturnus)

Eurus according to some was the southeast wind, but according to others the east wind. On the Tower of the Winds in Athens, Eurus occupies the southeast side, while Apeliotes is in the east. However, it is widely accepted that Eurus is the east wind, while Apeliotes is the southeast wind.

Eurus' Roman counterpart is Vulturnus, according to Pliny the Elder; but for Aulus Gellius Volturnus was the equivalent of the southeast wind Euronotus. Generally in the Latin poets the name Eurus is used for the east or southeast wind, as in Greek.

Eurus is a wind of storm, described as a turbulent wind during storms and tossing ships on the sea. He is referred to as the "savior of Sparta" in a Homeric paean, or poem. Eurus is also called the "hot wind" by Nonnus in Dionysiaca. Eurus is closely related to Helios in passages of the Dionysiaca, being called from his place near Helios' palace, Phaethon, where the sun rose in the east.

Lesser winds 
Four lesser wind deities appear in a few ancient sources, such as at the Tower of the Winds in Athens:

Kaikias (or Caecius) is the Greek deity of the northeast wind.  He is shown on the monument as a bearded man with a shield full of hailstones.

Apeliotes (or Apheliotes; the name means 'from the (rising) sun') is the Greek deity of the southeast wind.  As this wind was thought to cause a refreshing rain particularly beneficial to farmers, he is often depicted wearing high boots and carrying fruit, draped in a light cloth concealing some flowers or grain.  He is clean-shaven, with curly hair and a friendly expression.  Because Apeliotes is a minor god, he was often syncretized with Eurus, the east wind.  The Roman counterpart of Apeliotes is Subsolanus.

Skiron was the name used in Athens for the wind which blew from the Scironian rocks (a geographical feature near Kineta to the west of Athens).  On the Tower of the Winds, however, he appears on the northwest side.  His name is related to Skirophorion, the last of the three months of spring in the Attic calendar.  He is depicted as a bearded man tilting a cauldron, representing the onset of winter.  His Roman counterpart is Caurus or Corus.  Caurus is also one of the oldest Roman wind-deities, and numbered among the di indigetes ('indigenous gods'), a group of abstract and largely minor numinous entities.  The Roman poet Virgil writes when describing steppe winter weather near the Sea of Azov:

Lips is the Greek deity of the southwest wind, often depicted holding the stern of a ship.  His Roman equivalent was Africus, due to the Roman province Africa being to the southwest of Italy.  This name is thought to be derived from the name of a North African tribe, the Afri.

Other minor wind deities included:

 Argestes "clearing", a wind blowing from about the same direction as Skiron (Caurus), and probably another name for it
 Aparctias, sometimes called the north wind instead of Boreas
 Thrascias, the north-northwest wind (sometimes called in Latin Circius)
 Euronotus, the wind blowing from the direction, as its name suggests, between Euros and Notus, that is, a south-southeast wind (Euroauster to the Romans)
 Iapyx, the northwest wind about the same as Caurus.  It was this wind, according to Virgil, that carried the fleeing Cleopatra home to Egypt after she was defeated at the battle of Actium.
 Libonotus, the south-southwest wind, known as Austro-Africus to the Romans
 Meses, another name for the northwest wind
 Olympias, apparently identified with Skiron/Argestes
 Phoenicias, another name for the southeast wind ('the one blowing from Phoenicia', due to this land lying to the southeast of Greece)

See also 

Anemometer, modern device to measure wind
Bacab
Dáinn, Dvalinn, Duneyrr and Duraþrór
Norðri, Suðri, Austri and Vestri
Vayu
List of wind deities

References

Further reading 

 Apollonius of Rhodes, Apollonius Rhodius: the Argonautica, translated by Robert Cooper Seaton, W. Heinemann, 1912. Internet Archive.
 Aristotle, Meteorologica, 2.6
 Aulus Gellius, Attic Nights, 2. 22
 Grimal, Pierre, The Dictionary of Classical Mythology, Wiley-Blackwell, 1996. .
 Herodotus, The Histories with an English translation by A. D. Godley. Cambridge. Harvard University Press. 1920. Online version at the Topos Text Project. Greek text available at Perseus Digital Library.
 March, J. (1999). Cassell's Dictionary Of Classical Mythology. London. .
 Pausanias, Description of Greece with an English Translation by W.H.S. Jones, Litt.D., and H.A. Ormerod, M.A., in 4 Volumes. Cambridge, MA, Harvard University Press; London, William Heinemann Ltd. 1918. Online version at the Perseus Digital Library
 Pausanias, Graeciae Descriptio. 3 vols. Leipzig, Teubner. 1903.  Greek text available at the Perseus Digital Library.
 Pliny the Elder, The Natural History. John Bostock, M.D., F.R.S. H.T. Riley, Esq., B.A. London. Taylor and Francis, Red Lion Court, Fleet Street. 1855. Online version at the Perseus Digital Library.
 Pliny the Elder, Naturalis Historia. Karl Friedrich Theodor Mayhoff. Lipsiae. Teubner. 1906. Latin text available at the Perseus Digital Library.
 Publius Vergilius Maro, Aeneid. Theodore C. Williams. trans. Boston. Houghton Mifflin Co. 1910. Online version at the Perseus Digital Library.
 Publius Vergilius Maro, Bucolics, Aeneid, and Georgics. J. B. Greenough. Boston. Ginn & Co. 1900. Latin text available at the Perseus Digital Library.
 Publius Vergilius Maro, Bucolics, Aeneid, and Georgics of Vergil. J. B. Greenough. Boston. Ginn & Co. 1900. Online version at the Perseus Digital Library.

External links 

 Warburg Institute Iconographic Database (ca 40 images of Boreas) 
 Drawings of the eight winds on the Tower of the Winds at Athens

{| border="1" cellpadding="5" cellspacing="0"
! style="background:#ffdead;" |Myths read aloud by storytellers
|-
|Bibliography of reconstruction: Homer, Iliad ii.595–600 (c. 700 BCE); Various 5th century BCE vase paintings; Palaephatus, On Unbelievable Tales 46. Hyacinthus (330 BCE); Pseudo-Apollodorus, Bibliotheca 1.3.3; Ovid, Metamorphoses 10. 162–219 (1–8 CE); Pausanias, Description of Greece 3.1.3, 3.19.4 (160–176 CE); Philostratus the Elder, Images i.24 Hyacinthus (170–245 CE); Philostratus the Younger, Images 14. Hyacinthus (170–245 CE); Lucian, Dialogues of the Gods 14 (170 CE); First Vatican Mythographer, 197. Thamyris et Musae
|}

Characters in Roman mythology
Children of Eos
Deities in the Iliad
Greek gods
Metamorphoses characters
Personifications in Greek mythology
Roman gods
Sky and weather gods
Wind deities
Helios in mythology
Avian humanoids